The 2012 FC Shakhter Karagandy season was the 21st successive season that Shakhter played in the Kazakhstan Premier League, the highest tier of association football in Kazakhstan.

Squad

Transfers

Winter

In:

Out:

Summer

In:

Out:

Competitions

Kazakhstan Super Cup

Kazakhstan Premier League

Results summary

Results

League table

Kazakhstan Cup

UEFA Champions League

Qualifying rounds

Squad statistics

Appearances and goals

|-
|colspan="14"|Players away on loan:
|-
|colspan="14"|Players who appeared for Shakhter Karagandy that left during the season:

|}

Goal scorers

Disciplinary record

References

FC Shakhter Karagandy seasons
Shakhter
Shakhter